Gaius Julius Verus Maximinus may refer to:

Maximinus Thrax (c. 173–238), Roman emperor
Gaius Julius Verus Maximus (c. 217–238), his son and deputy emperor